The 1967 Auburn Tigers football team represented Auburn University in the 1967 NCAA University Division football season. It was the Tigers' 76th overall and 34th season as a member of the Southeastern Conference (SEC). The team was led by head coach Ralph "Shug" Jordan, in his 17th year, and played their home games at Cliff Hare Stadium in Auburn, Alabama. They finished with a record of six wins and four losses (6–4 overall, 3–3 in the SEC).

Schedule

Roster

References

Auburn
Auburn Tigers football seasons
Auburn Tigers football